The 2008 Le Gruyère European Curling Championships were held at Swedbank Arena in Örnsköldsvik, Sweden December 6–13, 2008. In a rematch of the men's A-Group final from the 2007 European Curling Championships, David Murdoch led Scotland to a second straight gold medal over Norway's Thomas Ulsrud 7–6 in an extra end. On the women's side, Switzerland's Mirjam Ott defeated home-country favorite Anette Norberg of Sweden 5–4. 

A total of 51 teams from 29 European countries competed.

Men's Teams

Group A 

*Mabergs skips and throws third rocks; Edlund throws skip rocks

Ireland and Spain drop to the B-Group

Results 
All times local

Draw 1 Saturday December 6, 08:00

Draw 2 Saturday December 6, 16:00

Draw 3 Sunday December 7, 09:00

Draw 4 Sunday December 7, 19:00

Draw 5 Monday December 8, 12:00

Draw 6 Monday December 8, 20:00

Draw 7 Tuesday December 9, 14:00

Draw 8 Wednesday December 10, 09:00

Draw 9 Wednesday December 10, 18:30

Playoffs

1 vs. 2 game 
Thursday, December 11, 20:00

3 vs. 4 game 
Thursday, December 11, 20:00

Semifinal 
Friday, December 12, 14:00

Gold Medal Final 
Saturday, December 13, 11:00

Group B1

Results 

All times local

Draw 1 Saturday December 6, 08:00
 12,  3
 8,  5
 1,  7
 6,  8

Draw 2 Saturday December 6, 16:00
 5,  8
 2,  11
 1,  14
 3,  7

Draw 3 Sunday December 7, 08:00
 2,  12
 2,  7
 9,  11
 2,  14

Draw 4 Sunday December 7, 16:00
 4,  7
 11,  3
 3,  8
 1,  16

Draw 5 Monday December 8, 12:00
 8,  5
 13,  3
 9,  5
 10,  3

Draw 6 Monday December 8, 20:00
 8,  5
 1,  9
 7,  6
 9,  3

Draw 7 Tuesday December 9, 08:00
 4,  9
 9,  7
 12,  2
 7,  4

Draw 8 Tuesday December 9, 20:00
 10,  2
 10,  3
 8,  1
 14,  6

Draw 9 Wednesday December 10, 16:00
 2,  5
 8,  6
 6,  13
 8,  2

Group B2

Results 

All times local

Draw 1 Saturday December 6, 08:00
 7,  6

Draw 2 Saturday December 6, 12:00
 8,  3
 9,  7
 5,  6

Draw 3 Saturday December 6, 20:00
 3,  8
 8,  3
 9,  6
 9,  4

Draw 4 Sunday December 7, 08:00
 12,  4
 6,  5

Draw 5 Sunday December 7, 12:00
 3,  6
 4,  8

Draw 6 Sunday December 7, 20:00
 8,  5
 8,  4
 7,  9
 6,  9

Draw 7 Monday December 8, 08:00
 10,  6
 1,  11
 5,  7
 7,  4

Draw 8 Monday December 8, 16:00
 8,  6
 7,  2
 1,  9
 2,  8

Draw 9 Tuesday December 9, 16:00
 4,  8
 12,  1
 10,  7
 1,  12

Draw 10 Wednesday December 10, 08:00
 2,  8
 9,  2
 8,  6
 7,  3

Draw 11 Wednesday December 10, 20:00
 3,  8
 5,  7
 13,  8
 6,  2

Group B Playoffs 

Finland and Italy advance to the A-Group

World Challenge Games 
Friday, December 12, 20:00
 5,  6

Saturday, December 13, 09:00
 6,  1

Saturday, December 13, 14:00
 7,  5

Women's Teams

Group A 

*Jensen skips and throws second rocks; D. Dupont throws third rocks and M. Dupont throws skip rocks

Netherlands and Czech Republic drop to the B-Group

Results 
All times local

Draw 1 Saturday December 6, 12:00

Draw 2 Saturday December 6, 20:00

Draw 3 Sunday December 7, 14:00

Draw 4 Monday December 8, 08:00

Draw 5 Monday December 8, 16:00

Draw 6 Tuesday December 9, 09:00

Draw 7 Tuesday December 9, 18:30

Draw 8 Wednesday December 10, 14:00

Draw 9 Thursday December 11, 08:00

Tiebreaker Thursday December 11, 15:00

Playoffs

1 vs. 2 game 
Thursday, December 11, 20:00

3 vs. 4 game 
Thursday, December 11, 20:00

Semifinal 
Friday, December 12, 19:00

Gold Medal Final 
Saturday, December 13, 15:00

Group B1

Results 

All times local

Draw 1 Saturday December 6, 12:00
 7,  10
 8,  6

Draw 2 Sunday December 7, 16:00
 3,  6

Draw 3 Sunday December 7, 20:00
 4,  11

Draw 4 Monday December 8, 16:00
 9,  8

Draw 5 Monday December 8, 20:00
 5,  12

Draw 6 Tuesday December 9, 12:00
 7,  6
 5,  9

Draw 7 Wednesday December 10, 12:00
 5,  7
 7,  4

Group B2

Results 

All times local

Draw 1 Saturday December 6, 16:00
 4,  12
 6,  7

Draw 2 Saturday December 6, 20:00
 3,  5

Draw 3 Sunday December 7, 12:00
 3,  7
 5,  7
 8,  4

Draw 4 Monday December 8, 08:00
 1,  11

Draw 5 Monday December 8, 12:00
 9,  1
 6,  3

Draw 6 Tuesday December 9, 12:00
 8,  3
 2,  9
 9,  3

Draw 7 Wednesday December 10, 12:00
 5,  6
 4,  9
 7,  8

Tiebreaker Wednesday December 10, 20:00
 1,  8

Group B Playoffs 

Norway and Finland advance to the A-Group

World Challenge Games 
Friday, December 12, 20:00
 10,  1

Saturday, December 13, 09:00
 7,  4

Saturday, December 13, 14:00
 10,  9

Broadcasting 
There is news that the Swedish national television SVT will broadcast four round robin games involving Sweden and follow Sweden through the play-off rounds. The event will also be broadcast throughout Europe by Eurosport.

References

External links 
 Official Website of the 2008 European Curling Championships
 Online results, teams, groups and statistics (web archive)
 European Curling Federation
 SVT

European Curling Championships
European Curling Championships, 2008
European Curling Championships
Sports competitions in Örnsköldsvik
International curling competitions hosted by Sweden
2008 in European sport
December 2008 sports events in Europe